Maulvi Amanuddin Mansoor is an Afghan Taliban politician who is currently serving as Commander-in-Chief of the Air Force of the Afghanistan since 7 December 2021. He was the police chief of the Kandahar Province from August 2021 to 7 November 2021.

References

Living people
Taliban commanders
Afghan military personnel
Taliban governors
Governors of Badakhshan Province
Year of birth missing (living people)